Eric Boswell Wynalda (born June 9, 1969) is an American soccer coach, television commentator, and retired player. He was formerly an analyst and color commentator for soccer coverage on Fox Sports 1 and ESPN. Previously, he served as head coach and technical director of Las Vegas Lights FC in the USL Championship and he was previously the host of WTF: Wynalda Talks Football on SiriusXM FC.

Wynalda was one of the first Americans to play professionally in Europe before returning to his home country in 1996 to play in Major League Soccer and scoring the first goal in the league's history. Until 2008, he was the all-time leading goal scorer for the United States national team. Wynalda was described as a "shifty, dynamic player off the dribble with a heavy shot." He was elected to the National Soccer Hall of Fame in 2004.

Youth and college
Wynalda, of Dutch ancestry, grew up in Westlake Village, California. As a child his team the Westlake Wolves, with Eric's father Dave as the head coach, won the state championship in AYSO soccer. That year Wynalda scored more goals than the entire division his team played in combined (58 goals in 16 games). His skills continued to improve year after year and he attended Westlake High School and was a three time All State selection with the school's boys soccer team and a youth club teammate of fellow national team player Cobi Jones.

Wynalda attended San Diego State University from 1987 to 1989 where he played for the Aztecs men's soccer team, scoring 34 goals and assisting on 25 others during his three seasons. His freshman year, SDSU went to the NCAA Men's Soccer Championship game where it lost to the Bruce Murray-led Clemson Tigers. While at SDSU, he also played two seasons with the local semi-pro San Diego Nomads of the Western Soccer Alliance. In 1988, he played a single game and in 1989, he played five games with the Nomads.

Club career
Leading up to the 1990 FIFA World Cup, Wynalda signed a contract with the U.S. Soccer Federation (USSF). After the World Cup, Wynalda signed as an on loan player from USSF with the San Francisco Bay Blackhawks of the American Professional Soccer League. During his nearly three seasons with the Blackhawks, he played only a handful of games with the team, devoting most of his time to the national team.

In August 1992, USSF loaned Wynalda to Bundesliga club 1. FC Saarbrücken for $45,000. When he arrived at Saarbrücken, he became the first American-born player to play for a top level German club. He had an immediate impact, scoring eight goals in the first half of the season where he played all 17 matches. This led Saarbrücken to purchase Wynalda's contract from USSF for $405,000. In the second half of the season he added one more goal in 15 matches to that tally. By the end of the season Saarbrücken was last in the league and became relegated. Wynalda scored 14 goals and had 25 assists in the 1993–94 season of the 2. Bundesliga. After the end of the season he was transferred for $850,000 to second division winners VfL Bochum which as such were promoted to the Bundesliga. There Wynalda remained without goal in his 22 matches of the 1994–95 season and Bochum was relegated. A hernia operation on August 30 limited his tally in the ensuing 2. Bundesliga season to seven matches mid-season – none of those for the full 90 minutes – where he scored two goals. Bochum, after finishing the league first, was promoted again.

Wynalda returned to the States in 1996, signing with Major League Soccer (MLS). As part of the process of creating the new league, known players were distributed throughout the league's new teams (except for the Dallas Burn, which alone amongst all MLS sides never received a United States national team allocation from the 1994 World Cup era). The league allocated Wynalda to the San Jose Clash. On April 6, 1996, Wynalda scored the first goal in league history in its inaugural game as the Clash beat D.C. United 1–0. He was named U.S. Soccer Athlete of the Year.

Wynalda was loaned out to Club León in Mexico in 1999. He tore both the ACL and medial meniscus on his left knee while with Leon which put him out of action for several months.  After missing the first eleven games of the 1999 season, the Clash traded Wynalda to the Miami Fusion. On July 8, 2000, the Fusion turned around and traded Wynalda to the New England Revolution for Ivan McKinley.  Wynalda scored two goals for the club, including the club's first ever playoff goal in a 2–1 victory over the Chicago Fire.

On May 3, 2001, the Revs sent him to the Chicago Fire for John Wolyniec, where he finished his MLS career, ending up with a total of 34 MLS goals (plus two in the playoffs). In 2002, Wynalda attempted to join the Los Angeles Galaxy, announcing that he planned to retire with the team. However, the negotiations with the Galaxy did not work out and he signed for the Charleston Battery of the USL First Division. Wynalda joined the team only to tear his anterior cruciate ligament in a pre-season match.  He elected to retire from professional soccer and became a broadcast announcer.

International career
Wynalda earned his first cap with the United States national team against Costa Rica on February 2, 1990. On March 14, 1990, he signed a contract with the United States Soccer Federation which made him a full-time national team player.  Later that year, Wynalda played in the 1990 FIFA World Cup in Italy, his first World Cup, earning a red card against Czechoslovakia, for retaliating against midfielder Lubomir Moracik, who had backed into Wynalda during a dead ball play throw in, pushing Moracik to the ground from behind in front of the referee, lineman, field judge and both teams benches (erupting the Czech bench), becoming the first U.S. player to be ejected from a World Cup match. The Czech player's treatment of Wynalda was in retaliation for a wildly thrown elbow on another teammate in the first half. Wynalda was lucky not to have been red carded then only to be ejected in the 53 minute leaving his side a man down for the remaining 37 minutes of the second half.

Wynalda was a part of the United States squad that won the 1991 CONCACAF Gold Cup. In the final the US beat Honduras 4–3 on penalties after a 0-0 stalemate after extra time led the game to penalties. Wynalda started every game of the tournament for the United States and scored the third goal for the US in their second group stage match against Guatemala, which the US won 3–0.

In the 1994 World Cup, Wynalda scored on a free kick from 28 yards as the United States tied Switzerland. He also played in Copa America 1995, where he scored against Chile and Argentina.

In 1998, Wynalda participated in his third World Cup, one of only three United States players (the others being Tab Ramos and Marcelo Balboa) to have earned that honor at that time. He finished the 1998 World Cup with no goals.

In 2000, Wynalda retired from the United States national team as its all-time leading scorer with 34 goals in 106 appearances. He was the sole owner of the record until 2007, when Landon Donovan tied the record with a penalty kick goal against Mexico in the 2007 CONCACAF Gold Cup Final. Wynalda lost the record when Donovan scored yet another penalty kick in a friendly match against Sweden on January 19, 2008.

Wynalda was named the Honda U.S. Player of the Decade for the 1990s, was named to the CONCACAF All-Decade Team of the 1990s and was elected to the National Soccer Hall of Fame in 2004. In 2006, he was named to the Ventura County Sports Hall of Fame.

Coaching career
In 2005, Bakersfield Brigade of the USL Premier Development League hired Wynalda as its technical director, and in 2007 he agreed to a short-term playing contract with the team during the last few matches of their season. On May 1, 2008, he signed a formal season-long agreement to play the entire campaign with the Brigade as a full member of the 2008 playing squad.

He has also continued to play with an over-30s amateur team in Los Angeles, Hollywood United, alongside former U.S. internationals Alexi Lalas and John Harkes, former French international Frank Leboeuf, former Welsh international player Vinnie Jones, and actor Anthony La Paglia.  United plays in the Los Angeles Olympic Soccer League.

Cal FC
Wynalda has been the head coach of Cal FC since 2012 and his side received attention in the 2012 Lamar Hunt U.S. Open Cup when they reached the fourth round of the tournament, upsetting USL Pro side Wilmington Hammerheads 4–0 and Major League Soccer side Portland Timbers 1–0 along the way.

Cal FC's victory over the Timbers made them the second-ever USASA side to beat an MLS side (the first being Dallas Roma FC beating Chivas USA in 2006), as well as the first amateur side to beat an MLS one without needing penalty kicks. It stands as the biggest upset in the tournament's history, especially considering the Timbers featured their regular starting lineup.

Atlanta Silverbacks
On July 2, 2012, it was announced that Wynalda will become the interim head coach and team adviser of the new North American Soccer League's Atlanta Silverbacks.

On January 7, 2014, the Silverbacks announced they would get rid of the head coach position and have Wynalda act as the manager and technical director of the team. This is something rarely done by a professional soccer club.

Las Vegas Lights FC
On October 17, 2018, Las Vegas Lights FC of the USL announced that Wynalda would be their new Head Coach and Technical Director.

New Amsterdam FC
On July 30, 2020, New Amsterdam FC of the National Independent Soccer Association announced Wynalda has the team's first head coach. On August 17, following two preseason tournament matches and five days prior to the start of the fall season, Wynalda announced his departure due to personal reasons.

Broadcast career
After retiring, Wynalda began working as a soccer analyst for ESPN. Along with Alexi Lalas, he was the channel's in-studio analyst for the 2006 FIFA World Cup on English-language broadcasts. Wynalda was one of the most vocal critics of U.S. head coach Bruce Arena during the tournament. However, after the World Cup, he was amicably paired in-studio with Arena as co-analysts for some 2006 MLS Cup playoff games, a successful arrangement which continued with ESPN's coverage of the US National Team in 2007. Wynalda was one of the main analysts for ESPN and ABC during the 2007 Major League Soccer season.

In 2008, he became columnist for Major League Soccer Magazine, an independent soccer magazine licensed with MLS and based in Los Angeles.

In August 2009, Fox Soccer Channel announced that Eric Wynalda would replace Steven Cohen as the co-host of the weekly discussion show, Fox Football Fone-in and partner up with Nick Webster who coached alongside Eric with Cal FC during their historic run in the U.S. Open Cup. In addition, Wynalda began working as a commentator for some of the channel's MLS broadcasts, and as an in-studio analyst during pre-game, half-time, and post-game segments for the UEFA Champions League.

In June & July 2010, Wynalda covered the 2010 FIFA World Cup for Yahoo! Sports as a video blog analyst.

He is currently an analyst for Fox Sports 1, covering Bundesliga, UEFA Champions League, and FA Cup.

In October 2015, Wynalda joined SiriusXM FC 85 as the host of the new program WTF: Wynalda Talks Football. Joined by the 'Stat Man' David Mosse, Eric covers the world of soccer, pop culture, and everything in between. The show airs Monday, Wednesday, and Friday from 7pm-9pm Eastern on SiriusXM FC 85.

Personal life 
Wynalda married Amanda Fletcher in 2014. They live in Thousand Oaks, CA with their three children and his three children from a previous marriage.

Wynalda's house in the Westlake Village neighborhood was destroyed in the November 2018 Woolsey Fire. Wynalda and his family had evacuated to relatives in Corona, California, where he watched footage of the fire on television. Of the 162 houses in Wynalda's Westlake Village tract, his home was the only one that burned.

Career statistics
Scores and results list the United States' goal tally first, score column indicates score after each Wynalda goal.

See also
 List of men's footballers with 100 or more international caps

References

External links
 
 Beers With Wynalda – Eric Wynalda's Candid Interview on FulhamUSA.com
 Eric Wynalda on the National Soccer Hall of Fame
 Eric Wynalda's profile on Soccertimes.com
 New England Revolution bio
 NY Times article on Wynalda
 Sams-Army profile, includes an extensive career timeline
 

1969 births
Living people
American people of Dutch descent
People from Westlake Village, California
Sportspeople from Ventura County, California
Sportspeople from Fullerton, California
Soccer players from California
American soccer players
Association football forwards
American Youth Soccer Organization players
San Diego State Aztecs men's soccer players
Nomads Soccer Club players
San Francisco Bay Blackhawks players
1. FC Saarbrücken players
VfL Bochum players
San Jose Earthquakes players
Club León footballers
Miami Fusion players
New England Revolution players
Chicago Fire FC players
Charleston Battery players
Bakersfield Brigade players
Hollywood United players
Western Soccer Alliance players
American Professional Soccer League players
Bundesliga players
2. Bundesliga players
Major League Soccer players
Major League Soccer All-Stars
Liga MX players
USL League Two players
United States men's international soccer players
1990 FIFA World Cup players
1991 CONCACAF Gold Cup players
1992 King Fahd Cup players
1993 CONCACAF Gold Cup players
1994 FIFA World Cup players
1995 Copa América players
1996 CONCACAF Gold Cup players
1998 CONCACAF Gold Cup players
1998 FIFA World Cup players
2000 CONCACAF Gold Cup players
CONCACAF Gold Cup-winning players
FIFA Century Club
National Soccer Hall of Fame members
American expatriate soccer players
American expatriate soccer players in Germany
American expatriate sportspeople in Mexico
Expatriate footballers in Germany
Expatriate footballers in Mexico
American soccer coaches
Atlanta Silverbacks coaches
Las Vegas Lights FC coaches
North American Soccer League coaches
United Premier Soccer League coaches
USL Championship coaches
National Independent Soccer Association coaches
Association football commentators
Major League Soccer broadcasters